The Tekojoja People's Movement is a Democratic socialist political party from Paraguay. Its name is a Guarani word meaning life among equals.

References

External links
Tekokoja

Foro de São Paulo
Political parties in Paraguay